Chattanooga Central High School is a public high school in Harrison, Tennessee, operated by the Hamilton County Board of Education.

Central High School opened in September 1907 on Dodds Avenue in Chattanooga. It was one of Chattanooga's first public high schools. Its students came from all over the Hamilton County area and the school was highly acclaimed. In 1969, the high school was relocated to Highway 58 in Harrison.

The school athletics teams originally went by the name Purple Warriors as the school colors are purple and gold. During an exceptionally good year in the 1930s a local sportswriter began to opine that they often "pounded" their opponents; the name stuck. The "Purple Pounders" is the current name, often illustrated with a hammer and anvil.

From the summer of 2008 until April 2018, Finley King was the school's principal. He was the second former student to serve as principal. Phil Iannarone is the current principal.

In early September 2019, an unidentified school administrator ordered washroom mirrors painted over because students were spending too much time checking their appearance. The decision was reversed after a Facebook post about it went viral.

References

External links
 Official website
 School student news site
 Hamilton County Tennessee Genealogical Society
 Central High Description at Hamilton County Board of Education Website
 Historical Chattanooga Central Football Scores

Educational institutions established in 1907
Public high schools in Tennessee
Schools in Hamilton County, Tennessee
1907 establishments in Tennessee